Avlabari is a station of the Tbilisi Metro on the Akhmeteli–Varketili Line.

The station was opened in November 1967 as a part of the second stretch of the Tbilisi Metro which connected Lenin Square (currently Freedom Square) and 300 Aragveli stations. The station was formerly named 26 Komisari after the 26 Baku Commissars.  It was renamed in 1992 after the  neighbourhood in Tbilisi, where the station is located.

The station was renovated in 2006.

External links
 Avlabari station page at Tbilisi Municipal Portal

Tbilisi Metro stations
 Railway stations opened in 1967
1967 establishments in Georgia (country)